is a Japanese kaiju, and superhero, film, serving as the film adaptation of the 2013 Ultra Series television series Ultraman Ginga. It was released on September 7, 2013, which takes place during the season break of Ultraman Ginga, in-between episodes six and seven. This movie is double-billed with short CGI movie, one of the shorts for the 2013 cardass game Mega Monster Rush: Ultra Frontier, which played first before the premier of the movie. A DVD and Blu-Ray release of the movie was sold on December 25, 2013 by Bandai Visual, costing around 3,990 and 5,040 Yen respectively.

Synopsis

Mega Monster Rush: Ultra Frontier - Dino-Tank Hunting
At a desert arena, various participants tried to take down the Dino-Tank Mk II. With most participants eliminated, only one team left: the Rush Hunters, consisting of Baltan Battler Barrel, Guts Gunner Garm and Magma Master Magna. After a failed attempt to attack while Dino-Tank trapped inside an electrical field, Barrel turned himself into a barrier long enough to contain the Plasma Monster for Garm and Magna to attack, but the technique greatly exhausted Barrel. In a last effort, Barrel quickly destroyed the last Plasma Soul, causing Dino-Tank to fall into a pit for the Rush Hunters to win. Their Hunter Leader, Djent, express his satisfaction before reminding himself that his team still had a long way to go.

Ultraman Ginga Theater Special

The film started with a brief introduction given by Alien Valkie to the viewers, where he review past incidents from first to sixth episodes of Ultraman Ginga. After finish reviewing, he told the viewers that the mastermind still had his supply of monsters before fading.

The mysterious figure surveyed through his Spark Dolls collection and brought one to life, an Alien Icarus. While Hikaru contacted his parents in Glasgow, Scotland, both him and Taro received visions of monsters, which came from Mt. Furuboshi. The next day, Hiakru and his childhood friends went on a hike to Mt. Furuboshi to collect six Spark Dolls that had been scattered. The group split into two, Hikaru and Chigusa, followed by Misuzu, Taro and Kenta. With Hikaru and Chigusa found one first, Kenta, Misuzu and Taro stumbled upon Alien Icarus, whom also had the same goal in mind. Tomoya joined the three as they confiscated the Spark Doll from Icarus and the latter expelled by Taro's power. Tomoya's arrival was only due to crossing paths with them in his investigating mission, but Taro insisted him to protect them.

With two Spark Dolls in his possession, Icarus tried to impersonate Misuzu to trick Hikaru and Chigusa into giving them their Spark Dolls but the Ginga Spark emitted a backlash wave that shed half of his disguise, causing the two to escape and met the other group via Tomoya's signal. Alien Icarus chased after them and hold Misuzu as a hostage, later taking the Spark Dolls in exchange of her. With the Spark Dolls in his possession, Icarus fused with them into the monster Tyrant. Hikaru as well decided to use a special Spark Doll, Ultraman Tiga and engaged in a fight against the monster. Having drained up most of his energy, Tiga almost defeated until Tomoya brought Jean-nine into the battle as the two defeated Tyrant, separating Alien Icarus from the six Spark Dolls. The captured Icarus tried to tell his secret out of the safety of his life but before he could do so, the mysterious figure turned him into a Spark Doll and bring forth Dark Zagi. The dark Ultraman quickly weakened Tomoya/Jean-nine in its frenzied combat skilled and nearly torn the robot until Ginga appeared and took over Jean-nine in the battle. Having fight in various continents around the world, both Ultra Warriors returned to the Mt. Furuboshi before they clashed their finishers, concluding the battle with Dark Zagi's defeat.

His Spark Doll was quickly recovered before Hikaru could find it. The group nonetheless return to their homes. Misuzu wondered if Hikaru's mission had concluded but both him and Taro denied as such.

After the ending credits, the Spark Doll Theater casts felt asleep until the realized that their screen time is currently running, causing all of them to go frantic. Taro, whom was watching the incident from behind reminded the viewers that Ultraman Ginga would return to broadcast in November.

Cast

Mega Monster Rush: Ultra Frontier - Dino-Tank Hunting
: 
: 
: 
: 
:

Ultraman Ginga Thater Special
: 
: 
: 
: 
: 
: 
: 
: 
: 
: 
: 
Unknown figure (Voice): 
Ginga Spark Voice:

Spark Dolls Theater
: 
: 
: 
, :

Songs
Opening theme

Lyrics & Composition: 
Arrangement: Toshihiko Takamizawa with 
Artist: Takamiy with 
Verse 2, which would be played in Ultraman Ginga episodes 7 to 11.
Ending theme
"Starlight"
Lyrics & Composition & Arrangement: 
Artist: 
Verse 1, the last to be played in the series before episodes 7 to 11.
Insert theme

Lyrics: , 
Composition & Arrangement: 

References

2013 films
2010s Japanese-language films
Ultra Series films
Shochiku films
2010s Japanese films